Lovetown, USA is an American reality documentary television series on the Oprah Winfrey Network that premiered on August 19, 2012. Lovetown, USA follows the community in Kingsland, GA as they take on Oprah's challenge to become one loving community in 30 days.

Episodes

References

External links
 
 

2010s American reality television series
2012 American television series debuts
2013 American television series endings
English-language television shows
Oprah Winfrey Network original programming